Liang Qiang (born 7 April 1973) is a Chinese archer. He competed in the men's individual and team events at the 1992 Summer Olympics.

References

1973 births
Living people
Chinese male archers
Olympic archers of China
Archers at the 1992 Summer Olympics
Place of birth missing (living people)